General elections were held in Thailand on 23 December. They were the first elections after the Council for National Security, a military junta, had overthrown Thailand's elected government and abrogated the constitution on September 19, 2006.  The junta had canceled general elections scheduled for October 2006 and promised new elections within 12 months. The Constitutional Tribunal then outlawed the Thai Rak Thai party, the largest political party in Thailand, and banned TRT executives from contesting in the elections for five years. After their political party had been dissolved, the former TRT members regrouped under the band of People's Power Party (PPP) led by Samak Sundaravej, the seasoned politician. Following its formation, the junta issued a classified order to suppress the activities of the PPP and to frame it for lèse majesté.  The order was leaked to the public, leading to a complaint towards the Election Commission from the PPP.  However, the Election Commission dismissed the complaint on the grounds that the Council for National Security (CNS) had granted itself immunity in the 2007 Constitution of Thailand.

The junta deployed 200,000 soldiers and police officers to maintain security and 1,500 officers to supervise after election fraud.  Charnchai Silapauaychai, a popular former Democrat Party member from Phrae who switched to the PPP for the 2008 election, was assassinated.  Five men, one of them cousin of a powerful Democrat Party MP were arrested, but all denied involvement.

Despite being the junta's target for suppression, the PPP won 233 out of 480 parliamentary seats, close to controlling the majority in the House of Representatives. The Democrat Party came in a distant second with 165 seats, Chart Thai 37, For the Motherland 24, Ruam Jai Thai Chat Pattana 9, the Neutral Democratic Party 7, and Pracharat 5.

Timing
Although the junta initially scheduled the elections within 12 months after the September 2006 coup, Minister of the Prime Minister's Office Thirapat Serirangsan later announced that the elections might not occur until one year and five months, which would put the election in February or March 2008. On the other hand, the chairman of the Constitution Drafting Council, Noranit Sethabutr, said in January that the timetable was to hold a constitutional referendum in August and elections between October and December; any problems in drafting the constitution or ratifying it through the referendum would delay the election date. This timetable was later tightened even further, with elections planned by the end of September 2007. A preliminary date was set in March 2007 for the elections to be held on 16 December 2007 or 23 December 2007. After the constitutional referendum, it was announced that the most likely date would be 23 December, which was formally agreed upon on 27 August 2007.

Electoral system

With the new constitution the number of MPs was reduced to 480, with 400 elected directly by the 157 constituencies and 80 elected by proportional votes in each of the eight electoral areas. Depending on the size of the population, each constituency may have up to three MPs.

Early voting started on 15 December 2007.

The eight electoral areas were designed such that they contain equal numbers of population.
 Area 1 : 11 provinces with 7,615,610 population -  Chiang Mai, Chiang Rai, Mae Hong Son, Phayao, Nan, Lampang, Lamphun, Phrae, Sukhothai, Tak, and Kamphaeng Phet
 Area 2 : 9 provinces with 7,897,563 population - Nakhon Sawan, Uthai Thani, Phetchabun, Phichit, Phitsanulok, Chaiyaphum, Khon Kaen, Lop Buri, and Uttaradit
 Area 3 : 10 provinces with 7,959,163 population -  Nong Khai, Udon Thani, Loei, Nakhon Phanom, Sakon Nakhon, Nong Bua Lamphu, Kalasin, Mukdahan, Maha Sarakham, and Amnat Charoen
 Area 4 : 6 provinces with 7,992,434 population - Roi Et, Yasothon, Ubon Ratchathani, Si Sa Ket, Surin, and Buri Ram
 Area 5 : 10 provinces with 7,818,710 population - Nakhon Ratchasima, Nakhon Nayok, Prachin Buri, Sa Kaeo, Chachoengsao, Chonburi, Rayong, Chanthaburi, Trat, and Pathum Thani
 Area 6 : 3 provinces with 7,802,639 population - Bangkok, Nonthaburi, and Samut Prakan
 Area 7 : 15 provinces with 7,800,965 population - Kanchanaburi, Suphan Buri, Nakhon Pathom, Ratchaburi, Phetchaburi, Prachuap Khiri Khan, Chumphon, Ranong, Chai Nat, Sing Buri, Ang Thong, Phra Nakhon Si Ayutthaya, Saraburi, Samut Sakhon, and Samut Songkhram
 Area 8 : 12 provinces with 7,941,622 population - Surat Thani, Phang Nga, Nakhon Si Thammarat, Krabi, Phuket, Trang, Phatthalung, Satun, Songkhla, Pattani, Narathiwat, and Yala

Competing political parties
Some of the political parties contesting in this election, covering 157 constituencies and 80 party-list seats, are:
 People's Power Party (Phak Palang Prachachon) led by Samak Sundaravej.
 Democrat Party (Phak Prachatipat) led by Abhisit Vejjajiva.
 Thai Nation Party (Phak Chart Thai) led by Banharn Silpa-Archa.
 Neutral Democratic Party (Phak Matchima Thippathai) led by Prachai Leophai-ratana.
 Royalist People's Party (Phak Pracha Raj) led by Sanoh Thienthong.

Opinion polls
An opinion poll in late August saw the Democrat Party in the lead with 43.0%, followed by the People's Power Party with 20.7% and Thais United with 7.7%. A poll from November 2007 saw the PPP lead with 39%, followed by the Democrat Party with 32%, the Thai Nation Party with 10%, the Neutral Democratic Party with 9% and For the Motherland with 5%. However, another poll from late November saw the Democrat Party lead with 43% to the PPP's 24%.

Results 
Two exit polls gave the PPP a clear first place, with either 256 to the Democrats' 162 seats (giving them an absolute majority of the 480 seats) or with 202 to the Democrats' 146. Four smaller parties also took seats. While the Democrats acknowledged their election defeat and stated it was the PPP's right to form the government, it is unclear what the military will do now, as the PPP is based mostly on former TRT supporters.

The preliminary final results gave the PPP 226 seats, the Democrat Party 166 seats and Chart Thai 39 seats. For the Motherland got 26 seats, Ruam Jai Thai Chat Pattana 10, the Neutral Democratic Party 7 and Pracharat 4 seats.

According to final results, the PPP won 233 seats, the Democrat Party 165 seats and Chart Thai 37 seats. For the Motherland got 24 seats, Ruam Jai Thai Chat Pattana 9, the Neutral Democratic Party 7 and Pracharat 5 seats.

By province

Aftermath

Disqualifications
A number of MPs (mainly those elected for the PPP) were given so-called "red cards" for suspected vote-buying, meaning they will not be able to contest the resulting by-elections, while other MPs issued with "yellow cards" are not banned from contesting such by-elections. By 2008-01-03, the Election Commission had endorsed 397 MPs and was still investigating 83 MPs for fraud.

By-elections were held on 13 January, 17 January, 20 January (the day before the first session of the newly elected parliament) and 27 January 2008. The Electoral Commission was still looking into allegations of fraud by PPP deputy leader Yongyuth Tiyaphairat; if he is given a red card, the PPP faces dissolution. PPP officials have stated that they are not worried over the possible dissolution, and that they would simply find a new party instead; local reports state that a likely candidate for takeover by PPP members would be the Thai Land Power Party (Palang Pandin Thai Party).

Disqualified were:
PPP
 red cards for Prakit Poldej, Pornchai Srisuthiyothin, Rungroj Thongsri – Buri Ram Province Constituency 1
 yellow cards for Boonlert Krudkhunthod, Linda Cherdchai, Prasert Chanruangthong – Nakhon Ratchasima Province Constituency 3
 yellow card for Thanatorn Losunthorn – Lampang Province Constituency 1
 yellow cards for Surathin Phimarnmekhin, Anan Sriphan, Cherdchai Wichianwan – Udon Thani Province
 yellow cards for Prasop Busarakham and one other MP, with Busarakham's card changed to red later – Udon Thani Province Constituency 3
 Thai Nation Party
 red cards for two MPs – Chai Nat Province
 Democrat Party
 yellow card for Suthat Jansaengsi – Phetchabun Province
 For the Motherland Party
 yellow cards for two MPs

Government formation
In January 2008, a coalition government was announced bringing together the PPP and the five smallest parties. The Democrat Party became the sole opposition party.

See also
Elections in 2007

Notes

References

External links

Elections in Thailand
Thailand
General
Election and referendum articles with incomplete results